The Cyprus national rugby union team is nicknamed ‘’The Mighty Mouflons’’ after a kind of horned sheep which is also the republic's national animal. They have won 28 of their 30 games and hold the world record for the most consecutive international rugby union wins with 24, which was ended on 15 November 2014 as they lost to Latvia. They were controversially disqualified from the knock-out phase of the 2015 Rugby World Cup Qualifiers, as they did not meet the necessary membership criteria according to the International Rugby Board.

History

The first international game of the Cyprus national rugby union team took place on 24 March 2007 against Greece in Paphos. The Cypriot XV won the game by 39-3 in front of 2,500 fans.[3]

In October and November 2007, Cyprus beat Azerbaijan, Monaco and Slovakia to win the 2006–08 European Nations Cup Division 3D, in their first year on the international scene. However, they lost the play-off game for promotion to Division 3C for the 2008–10 European Nations Cup on 6 September 2008 against Israel by a score of 23-14. This was Cyprus' only loss in international rugby for 6 years.

The following season, Cyprus had another attempt to be promoted as they played Bosnia and Herzegovina, Azerbaijan and Monaco in a round-robin home-and-away basis. They won every game scoring a total of 187 points and conceding only 17. They gained automatic promotion to Division 3B, although, for the following season, the divisions had changed numbers, so instead of moving to Division 3B, they were in fact in Division 2D.

The 2010–12 European Nations Cup saw Cyprus play in Division 2D (the lowest level of the second division) against Bulgaria, Finland, Greece and Luxembourg. They won all their games for the second consecutive year increasing their win success to 15 and making it two consecutive seasons and nearly four years unbeaten. They scored 4 or more tries in each of their games during the 2010–2012 season, including an emphatic 94–3 win over Bulgaria, and were promoted to Division 2C for 2012–2014.

Their 2012–14 European Nations Cup Division 2B campaign kicked off in style with a 54–20 win over Austria. They followed that win with consecutive home and away wins against Slovenia, Bulgaria and Hungary and also a home win over Austria. On 16 March 2013 ahead of their match against Bulgaria, Cyprus were aware of a potential world record of 18 games unbeaten which would overtake the official record of 17 games originally held by both New Zealand (between 1965 and 1969 and again between 2013 and 2014), South Africa (between 1997 and 1998) and Lithuania (between 2006 and 2010). They won the match comfortably 79–10. A month later, Cyprus were informed that they would not be eligible to qualify for the 2015 Rugby World Cup and were disqualified by the International Rugby Board due to 'not meeting the necessary membership criteria'.

Cyprus played in Division 2B for the 2014–16 European Nations Cup, where they were grouped with Lithuania, Latvia, Andorra and Hungary.

Motto

The Cyprus Rugby Federation has adopted as its motto the famous Spartan phrase:

Ἢ τὰν ἢ ἐπὶ τᾶς, translating as "either with this or upon this", an idiom that effectively means victory or death. The origin of the motto is ancient Sparta and "this" refers to the shield. Spartans killed in battle were carried home on the shield, while those returning alive and victorious from battle would still have it. A soldier fleeing the battle would have to drop the shield.

Kit 
Home

Away

Records 

World record for most consecutive international rugby union wins (24), which was ended by a 39-20 loss to Latvia on 15 November 2014.
World Record for most consecutive international rugby union wins by greater than a converted try (14).
World Record for most consecutive international rugby union wins by scoring 4 or more tries (11).
Won 11 away games in a row.
Won their last 17 home games.
Won 10 consecutive games by 30+ points, which was ended by a 16-15 victory over Hungary.
World Record for largest win in début match (39–3 v Greece in March 2007).
Scored 1239 points and only conceded 296.
26 of their 28 wins were won by more than a converted try.
Scored a try in every game they have played (30).

Home grounds
Until March 2010, Cyprus did not have a National Stadium, due to the poor recognition of the government they did not supply a stadium. Cyprus' first international was played in Paphos at Kiniras Sports ground. Then a further game at the same ground in the ENC 3D tournament against Slovakia. They then moved to the British Army base playing their games at Happy Valley in Episkopi. Now the national stadium has been recognised as Pafiako Stadium which is situated in the centre of Paphos. It holds a capacity of 10,000.

International record

Since their first match in 2007, Cyprus have lost only 15 matches out of Fifty.
They recorded their first win over Malta on 23 November by 18 to 16 to celebrate their 50th International, which now gives them a 70% winning ratio.

Cyprus are not a full member of the International Rugby Board, so none of their international matches count towards the IRB World Rankings.

Overall
Cyprus national XV record as of 14 November 2021

Coaches

Current squad
The following players formed the squad for the 2021–22 Rugby Europe Conference 1 South match against Croatia.
Known Caps updated after match with Croatia.

|}

Staff

Head Coach - Andrew Barnett
Coach - Alexander Zavallis Roebuck
Team Manager - Peter Morrish
Physio - Theo Lenos

Recent call ups

Vaki Antoniou - Maidstone FC
Yiannis Loizia
Marios Zakakiotis
Stevie Awah
Will Booth
Alex Pantechis 
Robert Yiannakou - East London RFC
Giovanni Francesco Dall'Amico - Limassol Crusaders
Luke Peters - Portsmouth RFC
Pantelis Stylianou - Sale FC

See also
Rugby union in Cyprus
Cyprus Rugby Federation

References

External links
Cyprus Rugby Federation
Paphos Tigers - Member of Cyprus Rugby Federation
 Limassol Crusaders RFC
 Cyprus university RFC

Rugby
European national rugby union teams
Rugby union in Cyprus
Teams in European Nations Cup (rugby union)